Ashes from Hell is a 4-track EP from American death metal band Possessed. The record was released on June 6, 2006, purposely (the digits of this date being 06/06/06) by Boneless Records. It is an official 7" vinyl that has rare mixes and live performances. Sales of the record were limited to 1000 copies, with the first 100 editions being sold with a guitar pick with the Possessed logo on it along with bassist Jeff Becerra's signature on the back.

Side-A of the vinyl features the two mixed tracks, while side-B contains the live acts.

Track listing

Venues of the performances
The songs "Death Metal" and "Burning In Hell" were both performed on September 7, 1985 at Ruthie's Inn in Berkeley, California.

Possessed (band) albums
2006 EPs